Anakie may refer to:
Anakie Siding, Queensland
Anakie, Queensland
Anakie, Victoria
Anakie Football Club